Little Mac is the main character from the Punch-Out!! video game series.

Little Mac may also refer to:

People
 George B. McClellan (1826–1885), American Civil War general and politician
 Joe McEwing (born 1973), American former Major League Baseball player
 Little Mack Simmons (1933–2000), American blues harmonica player and singer

Places
 Little Mac Ski Hill, a ski area in Mackenzie, British Columbia

See also
 Big Mac (disambiguation)
 Mac (disambiguation)